Begoña Sánchez Santos (born 26 June 1969) is a Spanish team handball player who played for the Spanish national team. She was born in Madrid. She competed at the 1992 Summer Olympics in Barcelona, where the Spanish team placed seventh.

References

1969 births
Living people
People from Madrid
Spanish female handball players
Olympic handball players of Spain
Handball players at the 1992 Summer Olympics